The common duiker (Sylvicapra grimmia), also known as the gray duiker or bush duiker, is a small antelope and the only member of the genus Sylvicapra. This species is found everywhere in Africa south of the Sahara, excluding the Horn of Africa and the rainforests of the central and western parts of the continent. Generally, they are found in habitats with sufficient vegetation cover to allow them to hide—savannah and hilly areas, including the fringes of human settlements.

Description

Colouration of this species varies widely over its vast geographic range. There are 14 subspecies described, ranging from chestnut in forested areas of Angola to grizzled gray in northern savannas and light brown shades in arid regions.

Behavior
Breeding is year round and the female gives birth to one fawn after a gestation period of 6 to 7.5 months. The common duiker has a wide diet; beyond browsing for leaves, flowers, fruits and tubers, they will also eat insects, frogs, small birds and mammals, and even carrion. As long as they have vegetation to eat (from which they get some water), they can go without drinking for very long periods. In the rainy season, they will frequently not drink water at all, instead obtaining fluids from fruits. They will often scavenge for these fruits below trees in which monkeys are feeding. They are active both day and night, but become more nocturnal near human settlements, presumably due to the presence of feral dogs and humans.

Males are territorial and smear gland secretions on rocks and branches to mark their territories; their preferred resting places are generally on elevated ground, where they can observe their territory. Females, by contrast, prefer deeper cover. The overall success of this species stems from its ability to inhabit a wide variety of habitats, as well as from its adaptable, generalist diet.

Gallery

Notes

References

 Animal. Smithsonian Institution, 2005, pg. 250
Alden, P. C., et al. Collins Guide to African Wildlife. Harper Collins, 2004.
Clutton-Brock, J., ed. Dorling Kindersley Mammal Handbook. Dorling Kindersley Limited, 2002.
Briggs, P. East African Wildlife. Bradt Travel Guides Limited, 2007.

common duiker
Mammals of Sub-Saharan Africa
common duiker
common duiker